Khalid Jawed Khan is a Pakistani lawyer who served as the 35th Attorney General of Pakistan. Khan is a Barrister at Law and Advocate of Supreme Court and has been practicing law since 1996. He specializes in Constitutional Law, Taxation, Service and Civil matters.

Education
Khan got his L.L.B degree from Queen Mary, University of London, his B.C.L. (Bachelor of Civil Law from Hertford College, Oxford University, and his L.L.M from Harvard Law School. He was also called to Bar at Lincoln's Inn.

References

Living people
Lawyers from Karachi
Harvard Law School alumni
Attorneys General of Pakistan
Alumni of Queen Mary University of London
Year of birth missing (living people)
Alumni of Hertford College, Oxford